Simraceway is an online racing simulation that hosted live, multiplayer racing events. The race environment was developed by Ignite Game Technologies, Inc. The service used a client-server software model similar to popular online games such as World of Warcraft allowing the racing environment to be continually updated.

Simraceway allowed racers to compete online for free or prize-based competitions monitored by professional race marshals who encouraged fair, competitive racing.  The service was free to join and went into full release in November 2011. The servers were shut down on August 14, 2016.

Gameplay
Simraceway offered multiplayer auto racing over the internet and used laser scanned tracks for millimeter accuracy  of the racing surface to provide a realistic experience.  The environment also used unique skill quantification technology to enable highly accurate player skill matching.  The platform was designed for both amateur and professional racing drivers.

Professional consultants
On August 9, 2011 two-time Indy 500 winner Dan Wheldon signed on to the Simraceway team to help design the gameplay experience.  "It was pretty obvious that Ignite was not looking to build just another racing game, so the opportunity to influence Simraceway'''s physics directly was pretty appealing."

On October 13, 2011, Dario Franchitti signed on to the Simraceway team to help with the design of the tracks, cars and overall gameplay experience.  "It's almost impossible to describe the feeling you get inside when you're behind the wheel of an old race car but what I hope to be able to do is use my knowledge and experience to help the team at Simraceway replicate how it feels to drive."

Tracks
In addition to original blueprints of many tracks, developers used laser scanning technology to achieve millimeter-accurate precision track recreations. Simraceway featured 30 laser scanned and fictional circuits, such as Mid-Ohio, Daytona International Speedway, Brno and more.

Licensing
Ignite Game Technologies signed deals to include modern and historic licensed content from a variety of car and racing brands including Bentley, Bugatti,  Ford,  Mitsubishi, Saleen and Volkswagen. Models included F1, Indycar & GT race cars as well as various street cars. On November 1, 2011 Simraceway licensed the entire catalogue (60) of McLaren group vehicles (both F1 and automotive divisions). For realism, vehicles were laser scanned and custom sound recorded.

Peripherals
On November 18, 2011 SteelSeries and Simraceway formed a partnership to release the "SteelSeries Simraceway SRW-S1" steering wheel, an officially branded, motion sensing steering wheel.

Racing facility
 On August 28, 2011, Simraceway'' teamed up with Jim Russell driving school and opened a 30,000 square-foot performance driving facility at Infineon Raceway in Sonoma, Calif. It offers 70 vehicles ranging from Karts to the Mitsubishi Lancer Evolution to a fleet of custom-built Lola-engineered Formula Three racing cars and is the largest single user of Infineon Raceway.

References

External links
Simraceway official site

Racing video games
Racing simulators
Windows games
Multiplayer and single-player video games